The NuoValascia, or Gottardo Arena is an ice hockey arena in Ambrì, Ticino, Switzerland. It is located only a few feet away from the former Valascia. The inauguration took place on September 11, 2021.

The arena serves as the home for HC Ambrì-Piotta of the National League (NL) and seats up to 6,775 spectators for hockey games.

Background
HC Ambrì-Piotta held the groundbreaking ceremony in December 2018 and construction officially began in April 2019, 60 years after the former Valascia opened. Construction for the arena had been postponed for two consecutive years as plans were to start in early 2017. The SIHF had been rushing Ambri-Piotta to begin building a new arena to let them compete in the National League as the old arena no longer met security regulations and was located in a potential avalanche path.

Opening
On September 11, 2021, the arena hosted its first official game, a 6-2 Ambri-Piotta win over Fribourg-Gotteron in a sellout NuoValascia. Ambri-Piotta's Johnny Kneubuehler is the first player to score a goal in the arena.

Naming
As of now, no sponsorship deal for naming rights has been signed.

See also
 List of indoor arenas in Switzerland

References

External links

Indoor arenas in Switzerland
Indoor ice hockey venues in Switzerland
Buildings and structures in Ticino
Sports venues completed in 2021
2021 establishments in Switzerland
21st-century architecture in Switzerland